Wafa ("trust", acronym from its full name in  Wikalat al-Anba al-Filastinija ), also known as the Palestine News Agency and the Palestinian News & Info Agency, is the news agency of the Palestinian National Authority (PNA), and was "the P.L.O.'s news agency" in the years before the formation of the PA.

Wafa provides daily news from Palestinian territories, Israel and the Middle East, and is available in English, Arabic, French and Hebrew, making it a major source of information over current events for those regions. Wafa, like PNA's other media outlets, are considered to be aligned with Fatah.

Following a decision at the Palestinian National Council's special session in Cairo in April 1972, the Executive Committee of the Palestine Liberation Organization announced the establishment of Wafa in Beirut on June 5, 1972. The same year Radio Palestine was also founded. While initially Wafa focused on giving official statements, its work gradually expanded to include different types of news. It began issuing felasteen el-thawra (meaning "Palestinian revolution"), a weekly magazine headed by Ahmed Abdel-Rahman.

During PLO's presence in Lebanon, Wafa was frequently quoted by foreign correspondents and news agencies. According to Kenneth R. Timmerman, writing for Commentary, Wafa was instrumental in shaping the Western narrative of the 1982 Lebanon War:

Following PLO's ouster from Lebanon, Wafa resumed activities in Cyprus and Tunis in November, 1982.

In 1994, PLO's institutions repatriated to the Palestinian territories as a consequence of the Oslo Accords. Palestine TV, Voice of Palestine, the daily Al-Hayat al-Jadida, and Wafa became the primary media channels for the newly established Palestinian National Authority. Wafa opened offices in Gaza City and Ramallah.

In April 2005, Mahmoud Abbas transferred PNA's media assets that were under the control of the presidency to the Ministry of Information under Nabil Shaath. At the same time, he merged the General Information Commission into Wafa. Hamas won the 2006 Palestinian legislative election and to preempt Hamas from asserting control of the media assets, Abbas transferred them back to the presidential office.

In October 2005, Wafa re-launched its French service. The French service had previously operated in Tunisia until 1994.

In September 2006, gunmen stormed Wafa's offices in Khan Younis and smashed equipment and beat up one reporter.

In 2009, Wafa launched a Hebrew version of its website; the content of this service would focus on Arab citizens of Israel, many of whom identify as Palestinian. It also started mailing a daily newsletter to Israeli members of the Knesset and Hebrew media outlets.

On December 10, 2018, Israeli soldiers raided Wafa's offices in Ramallah and fired tear gas into the building. The Palestinian Journalists' Union, the Palestinian foreign ministry, the Organisation of Islamic Cooperation, and the International Federation of Journalists condemned the Israeli attack.

In 2019, Wafa won the Federation of Arab News Agencies's award for best report.

Public service media 

According to an UNESCO study, the Palestinian publicly-owned media has privileged access to information from the government and sometimes exclusive access to events. This perceived favoring means that private media often has to rely on reporting from Wafa or broadcasts on Palestine TV. The study therefore recommends that the PNA's media assets; Palestinian Broadcasting Corporation (Voice of Palestine and Palestine TV), Wafa, and Al-Hayat al-Jadida should be transformed into independent, public service media.

Affiliations 
 Alliance of the Mediterranean News Agencies
 Federation of Arab News Agencies

See also
 Palestinian Information Center
 Ma'an News Agency
 Federation of Arab News Agencies (FANA)

References

External links
 Wafa website
 The occupation soldiers storm the headquarters of Wafa in Ramallah (video)

1972 establishments in Lebanon
Arabic-language websites
English-language websites
Hebrew-language websites
News agencies based in Palestine
Multilingual websites
Palestine Liberation Organization
Palestinian news websites